Ari Hercílio Barbosa (18 August 1941 – 18 November 1972) was a Brazilian footballer. He played in six matches for the Brazil national football team from 1963 to 1966. He was also part of Brazil's squad for the 1963 South American Championship.

References

External links
 

1941 births
1972 deaths
Brazilian footballers
Brazil international footballers
Place of birth missing
Association football defenders